The Wings of a Serf also known as Ivan the Terrible is a 1926 Soviet silent historical film directed by Yuri Tarich and starring Leonid Leonidov, Ivan Klyukvin and Safiyat Askarova.

The film's sets were designed by the art director Vladimir Yegorov.

Plot
The film takes place during the 16th century, during the reign of Ivan the Terrible (Leonid Leonidov). All-rounder Nikita (Ivan Klyukvin), serf of the nobleman Kurlyatev, reflecting a great deal regarding free birds once manages to soar into the sky on homemade wings. Nikita gets captured by the oprichnina for supposed communication with Satan, is shackled and sent to the command. However he is remembered from time to time as the master whose crafts amazed the world and is often invited to the royal court to fix broken machinery and amuse the high lords. But Nikitka always gets sent to prison with a new penalty is prepared for him ...

Cast
 Leonid Leonidov as Tsar Ivan the Terrible  
 Ivan Klyukvin as Nikita, serf-inventor  
 Safiyat Askarova as Tsar's wife Maria  
 Vladimir Korsh as Tsar's son Ivan  
 Nikolai Prozorovsky as Fedor Basmanov, courtier
 M. Arkanoff as Kurliator
 Ivan Arkanov as Prince Kurlyatev
 Tatyana Barysheva as Court maid
 Vasily Bokarev
 O. Britan as Appearing

References

Bibliography 
 Christie, Ian & Taylor, Richard. The Film Factory: Russian and Soviet Cinema in Documents 1896-1939. Routledge, 2012.

External links 
 

1926 films
1920s historical films
Soviet historical films
Soviet silent feature films
1920s Russian-language films
Soviet black-and-white films